The Lambda Literary Award for Gay Poetry is an annual literary award, presented by the Lambda Literary Foundation to a gay-themed book of poetry by a male writer.

At the first two Lambda Literary Awards in 1989 and 1990, a single award for LGBT Poetry, irrespective of gender, was presented. Beginning with the 3rd Lambda Literary Awards in 1991, the poetry award was split into two separate awards for Gay Poetry and Lesbian Poetry, which have been presented continuously since then except at the 20th Lambda Literary Awards in 2008, when a merged LGBTQ poetry award was again presented for that year only.

Honorees

References

External links

 Lambda Literary Awards

American poetry awards
Gay poetry
LGBT poetry
Lists of LGBT-related award winners and nominees
English-language literary awards